André Bizette-Lindet (28 February 1906 – 28 December 1998) was a French sculptor. He won the Prix de Rome for sculpture in 1930. His work is held in many churches, public buildings and memorials in France and other countries.

Biography
André Bizette-Lindet was born in 1906 in Savenay and died in Sèvres in 1988.  He studied under Henri Bouchard at the École Nationale des Beaux Arts in Paris and was the winner of the Grand Prix de Rome for sculpture in 1930 at the young age of 25 and in 1936 he won a gold medal from the Salon des Artistes français in Paris.  He worked with a variety of materials, including sandstone, marble, granite, slate, bronze, iron and ceramics.  In 1937 he was commissioned to create some reliefs for the doors of the Palais de Tokyo in Paris, a most prestigious award and his career took a further leap forward when he was requested to contribute to the decoration of the Round Salon at the Embassy of France in Ottawa, Ontario, Canada, which was just being built.  In 1939 he participated in the International Exposition in New York, working on France's pavilion there. He was commissioned to carry out the sculptural work for the memorial erected in Australia dedicated to all those Australians who had died fighting in France in the Great War, was one of the sculptors who participated in the huge undertaking at Suresnes to create a memorial to all those who had died in the Second World War as well as the memorial in Lille to all those in the French Resistance who had suffered at the hands of the Germans during the German occupation: the memorial for the martyrs of the Resistance. He completed much work in Saint Malo and Le Mans .  Other work includes a large bas-relief for the "Salle des séances" at the Palais de l’Europe in Strasbourg, a statue in Rheims Cathedral, work on the high- altar for the cathedral at Rouen, a large relief in honour of Jean Bart at the Lycée in Dunkirk and some decoration for a salon in the Palais de l’Élysée. Apart from his sculptural work he was an accomplished painter and was appointed as official painter to the French Navy. He was also responsible for a statue honoring General Leclerc in Le Mans, and for the seven bronze and gilded sculptures representing the arts which adorned the theatre in the place des Jacobins, Le Mans. This theatre has been closed down and demolished, although Bizette Lindet's work has been saved.  Also in Le Mans he carried out sculptural work on the University Science building in the rue Montbarbet.

Works

Gallery of images

References

1906 births
1988 deaths
20th-century French sculptors
20th-century French male artists
French male sculptors